Batavia High School is a public high school in Batavia, New York, USA. It is the only public high school in the Batavia City Schools district. The school has approximately 700 students and approximately 60 teachers.

Notable alumni
 Don Bosseler, retired NFL fullback, member of College Football Hall of Fame
 Eddie Allen, former NFL fullback and college football coach

References

External links
 Batavia High School website

Public high schools in New York (state)
Schools in Genesee County, New York
Batavia, New York